Raven Klaasen and Rajeev Ram were the defending champions, but chose not to participate together. Klaasen played alongside Michael Venus, but lost in the second round to Ivan Dodig and Ram. Dodig and Ram lost in the quarterfinals to John Isner and Jack Sock.

Isner and Sock went on to win the title, defeating Bob and Mike Bryan in the final, 7–6(7–4), 7–6(7–2).

Seeds

Draw

Finals

Top half

Bottom half

References
 Main Draw

BNP Paribas Open – Men's Doubles
2018 BNP Paribas Open